Canada's Sweetheart: The Saga of Hal C. Banks is a Canadian docudrama, written and produced by Donald Brittain. It aired in 1985 on CBC Television.

The film was about Hal C. Banks, a controversial American labour union leader who came to Canada in 1949 to lead a sectarian fight between rival shipping unions. Banks left Canada in 1962 after being brought up on criminal charges.

Banks appeared before the Norris Commission, which was set up to investigate his strongarm tactics and links to beatings of opposition unions, and non signed shipping companies. In particular was the ULS and the Maritime Union run by his former lieutenant Michael Sheehan, who had testified before the Norris Commission against Banks, and led the push to loosen the SIU grip on the Great Lakes.

Maury Chaykin played the role of Banks in dramatic reenactments.

Awards
Winner of five awards, including Gemini Awards for best screenplay and best direction.

External links

NFB Web page

Canadian Film Encyclopedia [A publication of The Film Reference Library/a division of the Toronto International Film Festival Group]

CBC Television original films
Canadian Screen Award-winning television shows
National Film Board of Canada films
Labour history of Canada
1985 television films
1985 films
Films directed by Donald Brittain
Canadian docudrama films
Films about the labor movement
English-language Canadian films
Canadian drama television films
1980s English-language films
1980s Canadian films
Labour history of Ontario